Wyoming Highway 111 (WYO 111) is an  state highway in Wyoming located in eastern Crook County.

Route description 
Wyoming Highway 111 begins its south end at I-90/US 14 (Exit 199). From there the highway travels north to Wyoming Highway 24 in Aladdin.

Major intersections

References

External links

aaroads.com - Wyoming Routes 100-199
WYO 111 - I-90/US 14 to WYO 24

111
Transportation in Crook County, Wyoming